= Red Wine (band) =

Spanish metal band

Red Wine was a Spanish heavy metal band. They released five albums, the first four on Arise Records.

== Discography ==
- Hijos del despertar (2001)
- El fin de los tiempos (2002)
- Sueños y locura (2003)
- Cenizas (2004)
- The End (2006)

== External link ==
- Discogs

=== Further reading ===
- Review of Cenizas by Metalfan.nl (in German)
- Review of Cenizas by Metalspheres (in German)
